Steric effects  arise from the spatial arrangement of atoms. When atoms come close together there is generally a rise in the energy of the molecule. Steric effects are nonbonding interactions that influence the shape (conformation) and reactivity of ions and molecules. Steric effects complement electronic effects, which dictate the shape and reactivity of molecules. Steric repulsive forces between overlapping electron clouds result in structured groupings of molecules stabilized by the way that opposites attract and like charges repel.

Steric hindrance 

Steric hindrance is a consequence of steric effects. Steric hindrance is the slowing of chemical reactions due to steric bulk. It is usually manifested in intermolecular reactions, whereas discussion of steric effects often focus on intramolecular interactions.  Steric hindrance is often exploited to control selectivity, such as slowing unwanted side-reactions.

Steric hindrance between adjacent groups can also affect torsional bond angles. Steric hindrance is responsible for the observed shape of rotaxanes and the low rates of racemization of 2,2'-disubstituted biphenyl and binaphthyl derivatives.

Measures of steric properties 
Because steric effects have profound impact on properties, the steric properties of substituents have been assessed by numerous methods.

Rate data 
Relative rates of chemical reactions provide useful insights into the effects of the steric bulk of substituents. Under standard conditions methyl bromide solvolyzes 107 faster than does neopentyl bromide. The difference reflects the inhibition of attack on the compound with the sterically bulky (CH3)3C group.

A-values 
A values provide another measure of the bulk of substituents. A values are derived from equilibrium measurements of monosubstituted cyclohexanes.  The extent that a substituent favors the equatorial position gives a measure of its bulk.

Ceiling temperatures 
Ceiling temperature is a measure of the steric properties of the monomers that comprise a polymer.  is the temperature where the rate of polymerization and depolymerization are equal.  Sterically hindered monomers give polymers with low 's, which are usually not useful.

Cone angles 

Ligand cone angles are measures of the size of ligands in coordination chemistry.  It is defined as the solid angle formed with the metal at the vertex and the hydrogen atoms at the perimeter of the cone (see figure).

Significance and applications 
Steric effects are critical to chemistry, biochemistry, and pharmacology.  In organic chemistry, steric effects are nearly universal and affect the rates and activation energies of most chemical reactions to varying degrees.

In biochemistry, steric effects are often exploited in naturally occurring molecules such as enzymes, where the catalytic site may be buried within a large protein structure. In pharmacology, steric effects determine how and at what rate a drug will interact with its target bio-molecules.

See also 
 Collision theory
 Reaction rate accelerate as result of steric hindrance in the Thorpe–Ingold effect
 Sterically induced reduction
 Intramolecular force
 Van der Waals strain, also known as steric strain

References

External links 
 
 

Stereochemistry
Physical organic chemistry